Nicrophorus hybridus is a burying beetle described by Melville Hatch and John W. Angell in 1925.

References

Silphidae
Beetles of North America
Beetles described in 1925